John Crouse (March 8, 1907 – March 17, 1982) was an American special effects artist. He was nominated for an Academy Award for Best Special Effects at the 17th Academy Awards for work on the film The Adventures of Mark Twain.

References

External links

1907 births
1982 deaths
Special effects people
People from Storm Lake, Iowa